Irma de Antequeda (15 October 1920 – 14 January 2005) was an Argentine fencer. She competed in the women's individual foil event at the 1948 Summer Olympics.

References

External links
 

1920 births
2005 deaths
Argentine female foil fencers
Olympic fencers of Argentina
Fencers at the 1948 Summer Olympics
Fencers from Buenos Aires
Pan American Games medalists in fencing
Pan American Games silver medalists for Argentina
Pan American Games bronze medalists for Argentina
Fencers at the 1951 Pan American Games
Medalists at the 1951 Pan American Games
20th-century Argentine women